Vladimir Cheptenari (born 26 September 1989) is a Moldavian football defender who plays for FC Zaria Bălți.

Club statistics
Total matches played in Moldavian First League: 46 matches - 0 goal

References

External links
 

1989 births
Moldovan footballers
Living people
Association football defenders
CSF Bălți players